Christina Batman Kotsia (born 10 July 1994) is a female water polo player of Greece. She was part of the Greek team at the 2015 World Aquatics Championships. At club level, she played for Olympiacos and NC Vouliagmeni.

See also
 Greece at the 2015 World Aquatics Championships

References

External links
profile at longbeachstate.com

Greek female water polo players
Olympiacos Women's Water Polo Team players
Living people
Place of birth missing (living people)
1994 births
21st-century Greek women